The Bilal Xhaferri Cultural Association, otherwise called "Cultural Community of Chameria", is a non-governmental organization centered in Tirana, Albania. This association was founded by a group of journalists, writers, artists and intellectuals, friends of dissident novelist and publicist Bilal Xhaferri. Its key objective was to present Bilal’s figure to the Albanian people, to compare Albanian cultural values, especially those of Chameria, with those of the most developed countries.

History 

The Cultural Association "Bilal Xhaferri" was founded in 1993 and since 1994 it operates as a cultural institution. It aimed to accomplishing better the mission of Bilal Xhaferri Publishing House which opened in 1991.  
The large number of publications of this Publishing House and its large activity in those years stimulated the foundation of an institution with more values than a simple publishing house.
The result of this intellectual collaboration was the foundation of the Cultural Association "Bilal Xhaferri", by Emrie Krosi, as a specialized institution that could expand cultural activity beyond Albania’s, with Kosovo’s and Macedonia’s borders, up to the United States of America, to coordinate the work with Cham organizations, Kosovo, Montenegro, and Republic of Macedonia Albanians organizations. The association aims to provide a great support for the Cham Issue, and the efforts of resolving this problem diplomatically.

"Eagle's wing" magazine, which was founded by Bilal Xhaferri in the United States of America, is the organ that continues to direct this association's activities. 
On May 6, 1995, the Association in cooperation with Albanian government, made possible bringing back the remains of Bilal Xhaferri to his homeland, Saranda, Albania.

See also
 Chameria
 Cham Albanians
 Chameria Issue
 Bilal Xhaferri Publishing House
 Bilal Xhaferri

References

External links 
 Homepage of Cultural Community Chameria
 Magazine "Krahu i Shqiponjës" ("Eagle’s Wing")

Cultural organizations based in Albania
1993 establishments in Albania
Organizations established in 1993